2,3-Dihydrofuran is a heterocyclic compound. It is one of the simplest enol ethers and a position isomer of 2,5-dihydrofuran. It is a colorless volatile liquid.

It undergoes lithiation upon treatment with butyl lithium.

References

Dihydrofurans